List of tallest buildings in Rochester may refer to:

List of tallest buildings in Rochester, New York
List of tallest buildings in Rochester, Minnesota